Palms Book State Park is a publicly owned nature preserve encompassing  in Thompson Township, Schoolcraft County, in the eastern Upper Peninsula of Michigan. The state park is noted for Kitch-iti-kipi, the "Big Spring" of the Upper Peninsula.

History
The Palms and Book Land Company sold the property to the state in 1926, insisting on the name and a ban on camping. John I. Bellaire arranged for the sale of a  parcel to the state for $10. The arrangement called for the establishment of a park that would be named after the land company. During the 1930s, workers with the Civilian Conservation Corps assisted in making park improvements that included construction of an observation raft, dock, and ranger's quarters.

The spring
Kitch-iti-kipi, the spring, is a pool of clear water 400 feet (120 m) across in its largest dimension, and up to 40 feet (12 m) deep. The spring water can be seen from above as it wells upward through the pond's bottom of bedrock limestone and sand, creating a continual pattern of random eddies and cross-currents in the depths of the pond. To the Anishinaabe people that were the original inhabitants of much of the Upper Peninsula, this site was a place of mystery and wonder. The water is 45 °F (7 °C) in both winter and summer.

Since the days of the Civilian Conservation Corps in the 1930s, the state has operated a manually propelled observation raft. The raft, which is fixed by cables, carries visitors onto the spring pond, allowing the depths of the pond to be seen from above. The pond is stocked with trout.

Indian Lake
More than 10,000 gallons (40,000 liters) of water per minute pass from the pond into nearby Indian Lake. Palms Book State Park protects approximately 1 mile (1.6 km) of lake frontage.

References

External links

Palms Book State Park Michigan Department of Natural Resources
Palms Book State Park Map Michigan Department of Natural Resources

State parks of Michigan
Protected areas of Schoolcraft County, Michigan
Civilian Conservation Corps in Michigan
Protected areas established in 1929
1929 establishments in Michigan
IUCN Category III